Houston Alexander (born March 22, 1972) is an American professional mixed martial artist who last competed in 2017. A professional competitor since 2001, he has fought for the UFC, Bellator, Shark Fights, the RFA, and KSW. He currently competes in bare knuckle boxing for BKFC where he is 3-0.

Background
Alexander was born in East St. Louis, Illinois, and lived there for the first eight years of his life. Growing up in a tight neighborhood, Alexander quickly learned how to defend himself before moving to Omaha, Nebraska. He was athletic growing up, and attended Omaha North High School, where he played football and wrestled, excelling at both and also started boxing when he was a teenager. He is also a very talented artist, mostly with graffiti, and was accepted to the Savannah College of Art & Design in Georgia during his senior year of high school, but ultimately decided that he did not want to leave behind his daughter. Alexander then worked as a head machine operator at an asphalt company, before turning to mixed martial arts.

Mixed martial arts career

Ultimate Fighting Championship
Alexander made his UFC debut at UFC 71 on May 26, 2007 against Keith Jardine. He knocked out Jardine in 49 seconds during the first round in a huge upset.

He has since trained full-time; three times a day and seven days a week.

Alexander then signed a new three-fight contract with the UFC. At UFC 75 Alexander beat Italian Alessio Sakara. Just like his previous fight, Sakara threw a couple of early shots before Alexander countered with close-contact strikes. "The way I was taught was that all your strength is inside versus outside,” Alexander said before the fight of his explosive ability when close to an opponent. "My short strikes are really, really good, and that’s from lifting weights and doing a lot of reps."

At UFC 78 Alexander faced then undefeated contender Thiago Silva. Silva won by TKO after the referee stopped the fight at 3:25 in the first round. In the fight Silva achieved mounted position on top of Alexander and landed punches until the referee called a stop to the contest.

On April 2, 2008, Alexander fought former WEC Heavyweight Champion James Irvin as the first fight on the televised portion of UFC Fight Night: Kenny Florian vs Joe Lauzon in Broomfield, Colorado. Irvin led off with a superman punch to the jaw that knocked Alexander down. He followed with three more devastating punches to the face that knocked him unconscious and Steve Mazzagatti rushed in to stop the fight. Alexander immediately got to his feet and protested the quick stoppage. The eight-second knockout tied the record for the fastest knockout in the UFC alongside Don Frye's knockout at UFC 8. The loss was officially ruled as a TKO due to strikes, although some sources list it as a KO.

Alexander fought Eric "Red" Schafer at UFC Fight Night: Diaz vs. Neer in his hometown of Omaha, Nebraska.  After landing some effective knees early in the fight, Alexander lost the fight via arm triangle submission in the first round.

Alexander was scheduled to face Andre Gusmão at UFC 98, but had to withdraw due to a broken hand suffered in training camp.

With the permission of the UFC, Alexander fought the late Sherman Pendergarst in a Heavyweight fight at Adrenaline MMA's Fourth Event. Alexander defeated Pendergarst by TKO due to leg kicks that dropped "The Tank" followed by punches on the ground.

Alexander made his return to the UFC at The Ultimate Fighter: Heavyweights Finale against internet superstar Kimbo Slice at a catchweight of 215 pounds.  Alexander was defeated by Kimbo Slice by unanimous decision (29–28, 29–28, and 30–27) in a bout that many thought would not make it out of the first round. The fight was characterized by Alexander circling away from Kimbo while utilizing quick but not powerful leg kicks instead of directly engaging him. While the first and third rounds were largely spent at a distance, the most spectacular moment of the fight arguably came in the second round when Slice administered a suplex that rocked Alexander. Shortly following the loss, Alexander was cut from the UFC.

Independent promotions
Following his release from the UFC, Alexander then fought heavy-handed Joey Beltran at 5150 Combat League's "New Year's Revolution" on January 16, 2010, in Tulsa, Oklahoma. Alexander controlled the first round by using movement and using quick leg kicks to keep Beltran at bay, In the second round Alexander was utilizing the same tactics that had won him the first round but Beltran caught Alexander with an uppercut-left hook combination that dropped and finished Alexander at 3:49 in the 2nd round.

Alexander next faced Rameau Thierry Sokoudjou on September 11, 2010 at Shark Fights 13: Jardine vs. Prangley. Following a tough first round that saw Alexander rocked and knocked down on several occasions, he came back in the second round to win via TKO (punches) at 1:31, he won Knockout and Fight of the Night.

Alexander next was scheduled to fight a rematch against  James Irvin from UFC Fight Night: Kenny Florian vs Joe Lauzon back in 2008, where Irvin knocked out Alexander 8 seconds into the 1st round via a superman punch. The 8-second knockout tied the record of fastest knockout in UFC history, until UFC 102, where Todd Duffee broke the record with a 7-second KO. It was set to take place at Shark Fights 14: Horwich vs. Villefort on March 11, 2011 in Lubbock, Texas. The fight was cancelled on March 2 due to a training injury suffered by Alexander and a failed drug test by Irvin.

Alexander faced Razak Al-Hassan at MMA Fight Pit: Genesis. He dominated and won the fight via TKO due to a doctor stoppage by a cut.

Alexander recently faced Canadian brawler Steve Bosse. He was knocked out in the 2nd round via a brutal elbow to the head from the clinch.

Alexander took on knockout-artist and longtime veteran Gilbert Yvel on Friday, March 30, 2012 at the second Resurrection Fighting Alliance (RFA) show. Houston lost via one punch KO in the first round.

On September 15, 2012, Alexander faced the KSW Light heavyweight Champion Jan Błachowicz at KSW 20 in Gdańsk, Poland. Błachowicz dominated Alexander on the ground for most of the fight, he lost via unanimous decision.

On March 30, 2013, Alexander defeated Dennis Reed via submission due to punches at Victory Fighting Championship 39.

On July 27, 2013, Alexander defeated Chuck Grigsby via Knockout in the fourth round at Victory Fighting Championship 40 to win the VFC Light heavyweight Championship.

Bellator MMA
Alexander faced former IFL Light heavyweight Champion and UFC veteran Vladimir Matyushenko on September 13, 2013 at Bellator 99 after Matyushenko's original opponent Christian M'Pumbu pulled out due to injury. He lost the fight via unanimous decision.

On April 18, 2014, Alexander faced Matt Uhde at Bellator 117. He won the fight via TKO due to doctor stoppage at the end of the second round.

Alexander was expected to face Pride FC veteran James Thompson on October 17, 2014 at Bellator 129 in a heavyweight bout. However, on October 10, 2014 it was announced that Thompson was pulled from the fight due to injury. Alexander instead faced Virgil Zwicker. The fight ended in a majority draw due to a point being deducted for repeated illegal headbutting.

A rematch with Zwicker took place at Bellator 132. Zwicker won the bout via split decision.

Championships and accomplishments
Shark Fights
Fight of the Night (One time)
Knockout of the Night (One time)
Ultimate Fighting Championship
Knockout of the Night (One time)
Victory Fighting Championship
VFC Light heavyweight Championship (One time)

Mixed martial arts record 

|-
| Loss
| align=center| 17–16–1 (2)
| Rakim Cleveland
| TKO (punches)
| Primus FC: Cleveland vs. Alexander 2
| 
| align=center| 3
| align=center| 3:04
| Woodward, Oklahoma, United States
|
|-
| Loss
| align=center| 17–15–1 (2)
| Rakim Cleveland
| TKO (knees and punches)
| Extreme Challenge 234
| 
| align=center| 1
| align=center| 4:45
| Jefferson, Iowa, United States
|
|-
| Win
| align=center| 17–14–1 (2)
| Brian Green
| Decision (unanimous)
| MMA Fight Series: Alexander vs. Green
| 
| align=center| 3
| align=center| 5:00
| West Des Moines, Iowa, United States
| 
|-
| Loss
| align=center| 16–14–1 (2)
| Evan Nedd
| TKO (punches)
| Redemption Fighting Championship 2
| 
| align=center| 3
| align=center| 4:57
| Oranjestad, Aruba
| 
|-
| Loss
| align=center| 16–13–1 (2)
| Guilherme Viana
| TKO (doctor stoppage)
| Bellator 146
| 
| align=center| 2
| align=center| 5:00
| Thackerville, Oklahoma, United States
| 
|-
| Loss
| align=center| 16–12–1 (2)
| Tony Lopez
| KO (punches)
| Legend Fights: Lopez vs. Alexander
| 
| align=center| 3
| align=center| 4:35
| Shawnee, Oklahoma, United States
| 
|-
| Loss
| align=center| 16–11–1 (2)
| Virgil Zwicker
| Decision (split)
| Bellator 132
| 
| align=center| 3
| align=center| 5:00
| Temecula, California, United States
| 
|-
| Draw
| align=center| 16–10–1 (2)
| Virgil Zwicker
| Draw (majority)
| Bellator 129
| 
| align=center| 3
| align=center| 5:00
| Council Bluffs, Iowa, United States
| 
|-
| Win
| align=center| 16–10 (2)
| Matt Uhde
| TKO (doctor stoppage)
| Bellator 117
| 
| align=center| 2
| align=center| 5:00
| Council Bluffs, Iowa, United States
| 
|-
| Loss
| align=center| 15–10 (2)
| Vladimir Matyushenko
| Decision (unanimous)
| Bellator 99
| 
| align=center| 3
| align=center| 5:00
| Temecula, California, United States
| 
|-
| Win
| align=center| 15–9 (2)
| Chuck Grigsby
| KO (punch)
| Victory Fighting Championship 40
| 
| align=center| 4
| align=center| 1:39
| Ralston, Nebraska, United States
| 
|-
| Win
| align=center| 14–9 (2)
| Dennis Reed
| TKO (punches)
| Victory Fighting Championship 39
| 
| align=center| 1
| align=center| 1:01
| Ralston, Nebraska, United States
| 
|-
| Loss
| align=center| 13–9 (2)
| Jan Błachowicz
| Decision (unanimous)
| KSW 20: Fighting Symphonies
| 
| align=center| 3
| align=center| 5:00
| Gdańsk, Poland
|  
|-
| Loss
| align=center| 13–8 (2)
| Gilbert Yvel
| KO (punch)
| RFA 2: Yvel vs. Alexander
| 
| align=center| 1
| align=center| 3:59
| Kearney, Nebraska, United States
| 
|-
| Loss 
| align=center| 13–7 (2)
| Steve Bossé
| KO (elbow)
| Instinct MMA 1
| 
| align=center| 2
| align=center| 4:11
| Montreal, Quebec, Canada
| 
|-
| Win 
| align=center| 13–6 (2)
| Razak Al-Hassan
| TKO (doctor stoppage)
| MMA Fight Pit: Genesis
| 
| align=center| 2
| align=center| 5:00
| Albuquerque, New Mexico, United States
| 
|-
| Win 
| align=center| 12–6 (2)
| Brian Albin
| TKO (doctor stoppage)
| Caged In The Coliseum: Albin vs Alexander
| 
| align=center| 3
| align=center| 0:26
| Jackson, Mississippi, United States
| 
|-
| Win
| align=center| 11–6 (2)
| Rameau Thierry Sokoudjou
| TKO (punches)
| Shark Fights 13: Jardine vs Prangley
| 
| align=center| 2
| align=center| 1:31
| Amarillo, Texas, United States
| 
|-
| Win
| align=center| 10–6 (2)
| David Griffin
| Decision (unanimous)
| UFA 1: The Clash at the Coliseum
| 
| align=center| 3
| align=center| 5:00
| Charleston, South Carolina, United States
| 
|-
| NC
| align=center| 9–6 (2)
| Justin Grizzard 
| NC (eye poke)
| Extreme Challenge: The Aftermath 
| 
| align=center| 2
| align=center| N/A
| Council Bluffs, Iowa, United States
| 
|-
| Loss
| align=center| 9–6 (1)
| Joey Beltran
| TKO (punches)
| 5150 Combat League/XFL: New Year's Revolution
| 
| align=center| 2
| align=center| 3:49
| Tulsa, Oklahoma, United States
| 
|-
| Loss
| align=center| 9–5 (1)
| Kimbo Slice
| Decision (unanimous)
| The Ultimate Fighter: Heavyweights Finale
| 
| align=center| 3
| align=center| 5:00
| Las Vegas, Nevada, United States
| 
|-
| Win
| align=center| 9–4 (1)
| Sherman Pendergarst
| TKO (leg kicks and punches)
| Adrenaline MMA IV: Sylvia vs. Riley
| 
| align=center| 1
| align=center| 1:51
| Council Bluffs, Iowa, United States
| 
|-
| Loss
| align=center| 8–4 (1)
| Eric Schafer
| Submission (arm-triangle choke)
| UFC Fight Night: Diaz vs. Neer
| 
| align=center| 1
| align=center| 4:53
| Omaha, Nebraska, United States
| 
|-
| Loss
| align=center| 8–3 (1)
| James Irvin
| KO (punches)
| UFC Fight Night 13
| 
| align=center| 1
| align=center| 0:08
| Broomfield, Colorado, United States
| 
|-
| Loss
| align=center| 8–2 (1)
| Thiago Silva
| TKO (punches)
| UFC 78
| 
| align=center| 1
| align=center| 3:25
| Newark, New Jersey, United States
| 
|-
| Win
| align=center| 8–1 (1)
| Alessio Sakara
| TKO (knee and punches)
| UFC 75
| 
| align=center| 1
| align=center| 1:01
| London, England, United Kingdom
| 
|-
| Win
| align=center| 7–1 (1)
| Keith Jardine
| KO (punches)
| UFC 71
| 
| align=center| 1
| align=center| 0:48
| Las Vegas, Nevada, United States
| 
|-
| NC
| align=center| 6–1 (1)
| Todd Allee
| NC (illegal knees)
| Extreme Challenge 76
| 
| align=center| 1
| align=center| 3:23
| Sloan, Iowa, United States
| 
|-
| Win
| align=center| 6–1
| Jon Murphy
| TKO (punches)
| Extreme Challenge 76
| 
| align=center| 1
| align=center| 0:56
| Sloan, Iowa, United States
| 
|-
| Win
| align=center| 5–1
| Demian Decorah
| Decision (unanimous)
| Downtown Destruction 1
| 
| align=center| 5
| align=center| 3:00
| Des Moines, Iowa, United States
| 
|-
| Win
| align=center| 4–1
| Brandon Quigley
| TKO (punches)
| Judgment Night 2
| 
| align=center| 1
| align=center| 0:41
| Des Moines, Iowa, United States
| 
|-
| Win
| align=center| 3–1
| Justin Butler
| KO (punches)
| Gladiators 20
| 
| align=center| 1
| align=center| 0:38
| Des Moines, Iowa, United States
| 
|-
| Win
| align=center| 2–1
| Chuck Purdow
| TKO (submission to punches)
| Gladiators 17
| 
| align=center| 1
| align=center| 0:58
| Hastings, Nebraska, United States
| 
|-
| Win
| align=center| 1–1
| Jamie Webb
| TKO (submission to punches)
| Gladiators 16
| 
| align=center| 1
| align=center| 2:18
| Des Moines, Iowa, United States
| 
|-
| Loss
| align=center| 0–1
| Jason Medina
| Submission (arm-triangle choke)
| Extreme Challenge 40
| 
| align=center| 2
| align=center| 0:47
| Springfield, Illinois, United States
|

Bare-knuckle boxing record

|-
|Win
|align=center|3–0
|Joey Beltran
|KO (punches)
|BKFC 33
|
|align=center|2
|align=center|0:38
|Omaha, Nebraska, United States
|
|-
|Win
|align=center|2–0
|Jay Fish
|TKO (punches)
|BKFC Fight Night: Omaha
|
|align=center|1
|align=center|1:41
|Omaha, Nebraska, United States
|
|-
|Win
|align=center|1–0
|Wes Combs
|KO (punch)
|BKFC 21
|
|align=center|1
|align=center|0:34
|Omaha, Nebraska, United States
|

Television 
Alexander made an appearance on the Fox Sports Network's "Sport Science" in 2009.

Music career 
Alexander, also known as "Scrib", "Cone-Dome", or "FAS/ONE", has long been a bastion of Omaha's underground hip hop scene. In the 1980s he led a hip hop movement in North Omaha called the Scribble Crew as an alliance of graffiti writers who developed a reputation as the top tag artists in the area. The art stands today at 24th and Binney Streets and 16th and Corby Streets among other North Omaha locations, and is still respected by the community. His Midwest Alliance act was active through the 1990s and into the new millennium, and is seen as influential on the Omaha scene.

Today Alexander is a DJ on KOPW 106.9, a local radio station in Omaha. He hosts an independent music show featuring hip hop and facilitates an elementary school program called the "Culture Shock School Tour" which teaches students about hip hop. Alexander has also been vocal about Omaha's lack of support for its hip hop artists.

Personal life
Alexander donated one of his kidneys to his oldest daughter in 2000.

Community work 
In February 2017, the Houston Alexander Foundation, Inc. (HAF) was founded to connect Houston's professional passions, MMA & hip hop, with the local community. The Houston Alexander Foundation uplifts the youth through educational programs and activities to promote a more positive self-image, benefiting families and communities across America and the globe. Under Houston's vision, we can improve society through education, culture, exercise, and community.

HAF's premier program is the Culture Shock School Tour. Since its inception in 2003, Houston partners with principals, teachers, & volunteers at K-12 schools & colleges in the Omaha metropolitan area and teaches the history of hip hop through music, dance, and art. Future projects include after-school programs and seminars focused on hip hop (DJing, breakdancing, street art painting), MMA, and youth leadership.

See also
 List of Bellator MMA alumni
 List of male mixed martial artists
 Hip hop in Omaha

References

External links
 Official Houston Alexander Site website.
 
 

1972 births
American male mixed martial artists
African-American mixed martial artists
Mixed martial artists from Nebraska
Light heavyweight mixed martial artists
Heavyweight mixed martial artists
Mixed martial artists utilizing wrestling
Mixed martial artists utilizing boxing
Ultimate Fighting Championship male fighters
American male boxers
African-American boxers
Bare-knuckle boxers
African-American radio personalities
People from Omaha, Nebraska
Sportspeople from East St. Louis, Illinois
Omaha North High School alumni
21st-century African-American sportspeople
20th-century African-American sportspeople
Living people